Hide My Eyes is a crime novel by Margery Allingham, first published in 1958, in the United Kingdom by Chatto & Windus, London.  It was published in the U.S. under the titles Tether's End or Ten Were Missing. It is the sixteenth novel in the Albert Campion series. It was a runner-up for the Gold Dagger Award.

Plot
An old country bus parks in London's Theatreland on a rainy night, and a murder ensues. Superintendent Charles Luke has his theories but it is not until he calls in Albert Campion for advice that they begin to come together.

References

External links 
An Allingham bibliography, with dates and publishers, from the UK Margery Allingham Society
 A page about the book from the Margery Allingham Archive

1958 British novels
Novels by Margery Allingham
Novels set in London
Chatto & Windus books